Diego Cánepa may refer to:

 Diego Cánepa (politician) (born 1972), Uruguayan lawyer and politician
 Diego Cánepa (canoeist) (born 1976), Belgian sprint canoeist